Oliver James Flanagan (22 May 1920 – 26 April 1987) was an Irish Fine Gael politician who served as Minister for Defence from 1976 to 1977 and as a Parliamentary Secretary from 1954 to 1957 and from 1975 to 1976. He served as a Teachta Dála (TD) for the Laois-Offaly constituency from 1943 to 1987.

He was elected to the Dáil fourteen times between 1943 and 1982, topping the poll on almost every occasion. He was Father of the Dáil from 1977 until his retirement in 1987, and remains one of the longest-serving members in the history of the Dáil.

Flanagan was a social conservative, who famously claimed that "there was no sex in Ireland before television". An anti-semite and anti-Mason, he used his maiden speech in the Dáil, on 9 July 1943, to urge the government to emulate the Nazis and "rout the Jews out of this country... where the bees are there is honey, and where the Jews are there is money" and called for the banning of the Freemasons.

Nonetheless, he was consistently popular in his own constituency, largely because of the attention he paid to individual voters' petitions and concerns. He has been described as "one of the cutest of cute hoors in the history of the Dáil".

Personal life
Flanagan was born in Mountmellick, County Laois, on 22 May 1920. He was educated at Mountmellick Boys National School and University College Dublin. He then worked as a carpenter and auctioneer. He was a member of the Catholic fraternal organisation the Knights of Saint Columbanus, and in 1978, was conferred a Knight of the Order of St. Gregory the Great by Pope John Paul I, given in Rome on 20 September 1978.

Independent TD (1943–1954)
Flanagan first held political office in 1942, when he was elected as a Councillor to Laois County Council, a position he would hold for almost forty-five years.

He was first elected to Dáil Éireann as an Independent TD for the Laois–Offaly constituency at the 1943 general election — the third youngest person ever to have been elected to the Dáil at that time. He had stood for election on the Monetary Reform Party ticket, an anti-semitic and Social credit party confined to his own constituency which proposed reducing the supposed Jewish stranglehold on the financial system.

During the campaign, Flanagan wrote to Fr Denis Fahey: "Just a line letting you know we are going ahead with the election campaign in Laois-Offaly against the Jew-Masonic System which is imposed on us. The people are coming to us – but it's hard to get the people to understand how they are held down by the Jews and Masons, who control their very lives."

He used his maiden speech in the Dáil to urge the government to use the Emergency Powers Acts to "rout the Jews out of this country":

Nonetheless, he was re-elected to the Dáil at the 1944 general election, with more than twice as many votes as he had won the previous year.

In 1947, he caused a controversy when he levelled accusations of corruption against members of the Fianna Fáil government, including Taoiseach Éamon de Valera, Minister for Justice Gerald Boland and Minister for Industry and Commerce Seán Lemass. A tribunal of inquiry comprising three judges investigated his allegations and found them to be untrue. Despite the judges' conclusion that Flanagan had lied to the tribunal, his vote increased by 45% at the 1948 general election.

During a 1952 Dáil debate, after John A. Costello had said "I made no reference to an Adoption of Children Bill", Flanagan quipped "Deputy Flynn would be more qualified to do that". John Flynn, who was not in the chamber at the time, interpreted this as an insulting innuendo, and later punched Flanagan in the Dáil restaurant. The Dáil Committee on Procedure and Privilege condemned the conduct of both TDs.

Fine Gael TD (1952–1987)
Flanagan joined Fine Gael in 1952. He served in government as a Parliamentary Secretary to the Minister for Agriculture from 1954 to 1957. In 1957, Fine Gael returned to opposition and Flanagan became front bench Spokesperson for Lands. In 1975, he was named Parliamentary Secretary to the Minister for Local Government.

When Paddy Donegan switched departments following the "thundering disgrace" controversy in 1976, Flanagan succeeded him as Minister for Defence, in Liam Cosgrave's government. He served as Minister for six months, until Fine Gael lost power following the 1977 general election. He was a representative on the Parliamentary Assembly of the Council of Europe from 1977 to 1987. Due to ill health, Flanagan did not contest the 1987 general election. His son, Charles Flanagan, was elected to his seat. Oliver Flanagan died two months after the election.

See also
Families in the Oireachtas
History of the Jews in Ireland

References

1920 births
1987 deaths
Alumni of University College Dublin
Anti-Masonry
Antisemitism in Ireland
Fine Gael TDs
Independent TDs
Irish anti-communists
Irish far-right politicians
Local councillors in County Laois
Members of the 11th Dáil
Members of the 12th Dáil
Members of the 13th Dáil
Members of the 14th Dáil
Members of the 15th Dáil
Members of the 16th Dáil
Members of the 17th Dáil
Members of the 18th Dáil
Members of the 19th Dáil
Members of the 20th Dáil
Members of the 21st Dáil
Members of the 22nd Dáil
Members of the 23rd Dáil
Members of the 24th Dáil
Ministers for Defence (Ireland)
Parliamentary Secretaries of the 15th Dáil
Parliamentary Secretaries of the 20th Dáil
Politicians from County Laois